Scott McPherson (October 13, 1959 Columbus, Ohio – November 7, 1992 Chicago) was an American playwright.

Life
He graduated from Ohio University.
In 1981, he moved to Chicago, where he acted in The House of Blue Leaves and "The Normal Heart," where he met actor and Pulitzer Prize-nominated playwright Steven Drukman with whom he lived for three years.  He joined the play writing group Chicago New Plays.
His partner at the time of his death was activist and cartoonist Daniel Sotomayor.
He died of complications from AIDS on November 7, 1992, aged 33.

Ohio University named a new theater space for him. 
The Goodman Theatre and the Victory Gardens Theater have established an annual playwriting award in his name.

Family
The son of Leo McPherson and Peggy Sansbury, he had the following siblings: Bret and Mark McPherson, Steve Sansbury, Hugh Sansbury, Susan MacDowell, Ellen Oatney and Cathy Hargett.

Awards
 1991 Whiting Award
 1992 Drama Desk Award for Outstanding Play
 Oppenheimer Award
 Obie Award
 Outer Critics Circle Award
 Induction into the Chicago Gay and Lesbian Hall of Fame (in 1992).

Works
 Til the Fat Lady Sings Ohio University
 Scraped Organic Theatre 1986
 Marvin's Room Goodman Theatre 1990

Screenplay
 Marvin's Room (film, 1996)
 Legal Briefs

References

External links
"Owen Keehnen Interviews", Queer cultural Center
Profile at The Whiting Foundation
"Scott McPherson", doollee
"Scott McPherson", IMDb

1959 births
1992 deaths
20th-century American dramatists and playwrights
20th-century American male writers
AIDS-related deaths in Illinois
American male dramatists and playwrights
American gay writers
American LGBT dramatists and playwrights
LGBT people from Ohio
Ohio University alumni
Writers from Columbus, Ohio
20th-century American LGBT people
Inductees of the Chicago LGBT Hall of Fame